Peptide deformylase, mitochondrial is an enzyme that in humans is encoded by the PDF gene.

See also 
 Period (gene)
 Timeless (gene)

References

Further reading

External links